Cook County was one of the counties of New Zealand in the North Island. It was established in 1876 and comprised the areas which today form the counties of Cook, Waikohu, Uawa, Waiapu and Matakaoa County, extending from Cape Runaway in the north to Paritu in the south. It was disestablished in 1989.

Original area now divided into five counties
NB: This section is derived from text in  available here at The New Zealand Electronic Text Centre.

When Cook County was established in 1876 it comprised the areas which, today, form the counties of Cook, Waikohu, Uawa, Waiapu and Matakaoa County, and it extended from Cape Runaway in the north to Paritu in the south. The members of its first council were: J. W. Johnson (Te Arai riding), J. R. Hurrey and C. W. Ferris (Gisborne), A. McDonald and J. Seymour (Waimata), E. Robson (Tolaga Bay) and T. W. Porter (Waiapu). At a meeting on 9 January 1877, Mr. Johnson was elected chairman, Captain Tucker was appointed clerk (salary, NZ£200 per annum) and R. M. Skeet, C.E., surveyor (salary, £150 per annum). Despite a protest by the Tolaga Bay ratepayers, the Counties Act as a whole was brought into force.

Te Arai, Ormond, Waikohu and Turanganui districts all had road boards in 1877. Patutahi followed in 1879, and then: Whataupoko (1882), Waimata (1885), Kaiti (1887), Ngatapa (1893), Pouawa and Aroha (1896) and Titirangi and Taruheru (1897). None of them functioned after December 1917.

At the end of 1877, the council opened up the stone deposit at Waihirere and laid down a tramline. At the outset, the trucks were drawn by a small engine, which was driven by Fred Benson, with whom Bill Watt was associated as fireman. A larger engine was afterwards obtained, but it failed the line. In the end, horses had to be employed. Waihirere stone was used for the foundations of the road between Makaraka and Ormond, and it has stood up to a constant stream of traffic. A lot of stone from the quarry also went into the foundations of Gisborne's main thoroughfare. When the quarry began to fail in 1885 another was opened up in the Patutahi district. This quarry proved a valuable source of supply and is still (1949) being drawn upon. Supplementary supplies have, for some years, been obtained from Waerenga-o-Kuri.

Census
According to the census taken in 1878, there were 1,541 European residents within the original boundaries of Cook County: Waiapu Riding, 109; Tolaga Bay, 187; Waimata, 101; Gisborne, 871; and Te Arai, 273.

The Maori population within the area originally occupied by Cook County has more than doubled in less than 40 years, whereas the European population during the same period has increased not much above 25 percent, and was in 1945, much below the 1926 figure. Maori census figures:

1906: Waiapu, 2,611; Cook County, approximately 1,500; total, 4,111.
1926: Matakaoa, 963; Waiapu, 3,292; Uawa, 592; Waikohu, 536; Cook, 940; total, 6,323.
1945: Matakaoa, 1,547; Waiapu, 4,341; Uawa, 754; Waikohu, 1,028: Cook, 1,468; total, 9,138, plus 3 per cent. as an allowance in respect of native residents absent on war activities.

Notable people
William Knox Chambers (born in South Australia in 1850) was taken by his parents in 1854 to Hawke's Bay, where he was brought up to sheep farming. In 1873 he bought Repongaere. He served on the Ormond, Waikohu and Ngatapa Road Boards, Cook County Council and Gisborne Harbour Board.
James Macfarlane (born in North Canterbury in 1853) took up a run in the Amuri district. For nine years he was chairman of Amuri County Council. In 1892 he bought Takapau (10,470 acres). He served on Cook County Council, the Hospital Board, the Farmers' Union and the Poverty Bay A. and P. Association. The Government acquired Takapau in 1903.
 Charles Gray (born near Huntingdon, England, in 1840) followed the sea early in life. In 1868 he and his new wife Lucy (née Waters) went to Queensland to join his brother Robert, where they engaged in pastoral pursuits. He acquired Waiohika in 1877. His first wife, Lucy, died in Dunedin on 2 December 1879. His public service included the chairmanship both of Cook County Council and Cook Hospital Board. He died at Dunedin on 8 March 1918. His second wife (a daughter of Bishop W. L. Williams) was born at Whakato in 1856 and died in 1942.
 Thomas Jex-Blake (born at Norwich in 1857) was employed in Poverty Bay by his uncle (J. W. Johnson). For some years he managed Taureka, and then bought properties at Waerenga-o-Kuri and Te Arai. He died in April 1928.
 Charles Matthews (born in England in 1878) came out to Poverty Bay with his parents, assisted his father to develop Te Ruanui, and then bought properties on his own account. He was a member of Cook County Council for 24 years, and also served on the Poverty Bay Power Board and Cook Hospital Board. He died on 8 December 1942.
 John Warren (born at Woolwich in 1844) arrived at Auckland with his parents in 1847. He fought in the Waikato War. In 1873 he moved to Gisborne, which then had only 116 houses, many of them being only shacks on sledges. His first job was in connection with the erection of the first Masonic Hotel. He was the sponsor of Oddfellowship in Gisborne, a keen volunteer and a strong supporter of the hospital. A foundation member of St. Andrew's Presbyterian Church, he was a Sunday School teacher from 1874 until 1888, and then superintendent for nearly 30 years. He died on 30 March 1919.
 De Gennes Fraser (born at Karachi in 1852) left India with his parents for Jersey upon the retirement of his father from the service of the East India Company. He came out to New Zealand in 1870. Whilst he was engaged in Government survey work with a party in Taranaki in 1878, trouble arose with the natives, who sent their womenfolk to remove the flags and pegs on Ngutuwera block. He died in Auckland on 4 June 1938.
 Robert Mixer Skeet (born in 1832) migrated in 1854 to Nelson, where he spent several years. Next, he engaged upon survey work in Hawke's Bay. From 1865 until 1871 he was Wellington city surveyor. In 1872 he advertised himself in Gisborne as “a civil engineer, surveyor, land and general agent.” He was the first engineer to Cook County (1877–78) and afterwards engaged in private practice in Gisborne. He died on 21 March 1894.
 John Joseph Keane came to Gisborne from the West Coast (South Island) in 1902 to join the staff of the Public Works Department. In 1908 he became overseer to Cook County, and, in 1921, he was appointed engineer. He had a fatal seizure on 20 December 1927, whilst he was driving his car over a temporary bridge at Waimata.

See also 
 List of former territorial authorities in New Zealand § Counties

References 

 

Counties of New Zealand
Politics of the Gisborne District